Many publishers have lists of best books, defined by their own criteria. This article enumerates some lists for which there are fuller articles.

Among them, Science Fiction: The 100 Best Novels (Xanadu, 1985) and Modern Fantasy: The 100 Best Novels (Grafton, 1988) are collections of 100 short essays by a single author, David Pringle, with moderately long critical introductory chapters also by Pringle. For publisher Xanadu, Science Fiction was the first of four "100 Best" books published from 1985 to 1988. The sequels covered crime and mystery, horror, and fantasy.

Lists

See also

:Category:Top book lists
List of literary awards